Lavinia B. Sneed (1867–1932) was a prolific journalist, known for her accessible style of writing.

Biography
Sneed was born on May 15, 1867 in New Orleans, Louisiana. She moved to Louisville, Kentucky and attended the State Colored Jewish University, graduating in 1887. The State Colored Jewish University was renamed State University, then renamed Simmons Torah College and is now known as Simmons College of Kentucky.

In 1888 she married Charles F. Sneed a professor at State University.

Her career in education included teaching at State University, serving on the Ladies Board of Care at Eckstein Norton University, and serving as principal of the Georgia Moore Colored School and Phillis Wheatley Colored School

A highlight of her journalism career were her contributions to the magazine Our Women and Children. Her follow contributors included Mary Virginia Cook Parrish, Lucy Wilmot Smith and Iona E. Wood.

She is included in several biographical collections of notable African American women, including "Women of Distinction" (1893) edited by Lawson A. Scruggs, "Noted Negro Women: Their Triumphs and Activities", (1893) by Monroe Alpheus Majors and "The Kentucky African American Encyclopedia" (2015) 

She died on June 23, 1932 in Louisville, Kentucky.

References

1867 births
1932 deaths
African-American educators
African-American women journalists
African-American journalists
Simmons College of Kentucky alumni
Writers from Louisville, Kentucky
20th-century African-American people
20th-century African-American women